Anders Söderberg (born 8 July 1971) is a Swedish luger. He competed at the 1994 Winter Olympics, the 1998 Winter Olympics and the 2002 Winter Olympics.

References

External links
 

1971 births
Living people
Swedish male lugers
Olympic lugers of Sweden
Lugers at the 1994 Winter Olympics
Lugers at the 1998 Winter Olympics
Lugers at the 2002 Winter Olympics
Sportspeople from Stockholm